Francisco Dall'Anese Ruiz (born 1960) was the Attorney-General of Costa Rica.

Biography 
Dall'Anese attended the University of Costa Rica, where he studied law.
He later taught criminal law at the University, and is co-author of five books and over 20 academic papers on topics of criminal, judicial and procedural law.  In 2004, he was presented with an honorary doctorate by the Universidad Escuela Libre de Derecho ('University Free School of Law') of Costa Rica.

Dall'Anese became Attorney-General of Costa Rica in 2003. In this position, he led efforts against narco-trafficking, organised crime and corruption, including investigations of two former presidents.

In 2005, the National Values Commission awarded Dall'Anese the National Values Prize in recognition of his actions to combat organised crime. He served as alternate magistrate in the Supreme Court of Justice of Costa Rica and, as of 2010, is President pro tempore of the Central American Public Ministries Council.

On 30 June 2010, United Nations Secretary-General Ban Ki-moon named Dall'Anese as Carlos Castresana's replacement as chief of the International Commission against Impunity in Guatemala (CICIG).

References

1960 births
Living people
Attorneys general
20th-century Costa Rican lawyers
University of Costa Rica alumni
Academic staff of the University of Costa Rica
Government ministers of Costa Rica
Costa Rican people of Italian descent
21st-century Costa Rican judges
Supreme Court of Justice of Costa Rica judges
People from Grecia (canton)